Robby Benson (born Robin David Segal; January 21, 1956) is an American actor and director. He rose to prominence as a teen idol in the late 1970s, appearing in the sports films One on One (1977) and Ice Castles (1978). He subsequently garnered more fame for portraying the voice of Beast in the Disney animated film Beauty and the Beast (1991) and its numerous sequels and spin-offs. He later directed television, including six episodes of the sitcom Friends.

In addition to acting and directing, Benson is an activist in the field of heart research, having undergone four open-heart surgeries since age 28 to correct congenital aortic valve defects and related damage. In 2012, he published a memoir recounting his medical journey and numerous surgeries.

Early life
Benson was born in Dallas, Texas, the son of Freda Ann (née Benson), a singer, actor, and business promotions manager, and Jerry Segal, a writer. His family is Jewish. When Benson was five years old, his family relocated to New York City, where he was raised. He subsequently took his mother's name as his stage name when he was 10. Benson attended the Lincoln Square Academy in Manhattan, where he graduated at age fourteen as the class valedictorian.

Career
Benson made his film debut with an uncredited role in Wait Until Dark (1967) as the Boy Tossing Ball and his Broadway debut in The Rothschilds (1970). Benson had an early role on the daytime soap Search for Tomorrow (1971–1972). As a film actor, Benson was well known for teenage roles in coming of age films, such as 1972's Jory, 1973's Jeremy, and as Billy Joe McAllister in 1976's Ode to Billy Joe. He had an appearance in a 1973 commercial for Reese's Peanut Butter Cups alongside Donny Most who would later co-star in Happy Days.

In 1975, Benson appeared in Death Be Not Proud and Lucky Lady. That year, he also screen tested for the role of Luke Skywalker in Star Wars, a role which eventually went to Mark Hamill. In 1977, Benson starred in One on One (which he co-wrote with his father and needed no double for the authentic looking college basketball scenes due to his prowess at the game) and the TV movie The Death of Richie. In 1978, he co-starred in The End and Ice Castles. Benson, who had never ice skated before, learned to skate in order to film the movie, which had numerous skating scenes, including ice hockey. In 1980, Benson starred in Die Laughing and Tribute.

In 1981, he costarred in The Chosen, based on the book of the same name by Chaim Potok. The New York Times gave the film a mixed review, but noted that Benson's character was "full of a gentle inquisitiveness that cannot help but win the audience's sympathy." Benson played Olympic 10,000-meter gold medalist Billy Mills in the 1983 film Running Brave. From the filming of this movie Benson implemented his training for the 1983 New York City Marathon, completing the race in 3:05:15. In 1991, he starred as the voice of Beast in the animated Disney film Beauty and the Beast. Later in the 1990s he voiced lead character J.T. Marsh on the sci-fi cartoon series Exosquad.

His 2007 novel Who Stole the Funny?: A Novel of Hollywood landed Benson on the Los Angeles Times Bestseller list. Benson's medical memoir I'm Not Dead ... Yet! was released in June 2012. Outside of acting, Benson is also a musician and composer. He has composed songs in several films and has also won a RIAA Gold Records award for the song "We Are Not Alone" in the John Hughes film The Breakfast Club.

Benson has been a professor at New York University's Tisch School of the Arts, the University of Utah and the University of South Carolina. It was announced he would serve as a professor of Practice in the fall of 2013 at Indiana University. Benson left the university after the Spring 2016 semester when his three-year contract expired.

Personal life
Benson has been married to singer and actress Karla DeVito since July 11, 1982. The pair met while starring together in The Pirates of Penzance. Together they have two children, daughter Lyric (b. 1983) and son Zephyr (b. 1992). He practices Transcendental Meditation.

Health problems and activism
While a teenager, Benson was diagnosed with a heart murmur caused by a bicuspid aortic valve defect. Benson began experiencing symptoms such as dizziness and losing consciousness in his late twenties, and subsequently underwent his first open-heart surgery in October 1984 to repair the valve defect. He received a bovine valve transplant, which lasted fifteen years. After the bovine valve failed, Benson was required to have a second surgery in 2000, during which he underwent the Ross procedure. For six years after his second surgery, Benson had consistent struggles breathing. He subsequently underwent a third open-heart surgery, during which it was discovered that his aortic valve had buckled from the previous procedure and was closed approximately 90%, accounting for the breathing problems he had endured for the previous six years. Benson received a delicate fourth surgery known as the "reverse Ross procedure" to correct damage to his heart in 2010.

Benson is an activist and fundraiser for heart research, which, in 2004, led him to write the book, lyrics and music for an original Off-Broadway play called Open Heart, in which he also starred. Benson also has spoken about his dealing with post-surgical cardiac depression, commenting after his fourth surgery:

Filmography

Film

Television

Video games

Theatre

Production credits

Director
 White Hot (1989)
 Modern Love (1990)
 Family Album (TV Series) - 4 episodes
 1.3 "Guardian Angel" (1993)
 1.4 "Winter, Spring, Summer or Fall All You Gotta Do Is Call..." (1993)
 1.5 "Salon, Farewell, Auf Wiedersehn, Goodbye" (1993)
 1.6 "Will You Still Feed Me?" (1993)
 Evening Shade (TV Series) - 8 episodes
 3.14 "Private School" (1993)
 3.22 "Teaching Is a Good Thing" (1993)
 3.24 "The Graduation" (1993)
 4.8 "Wood and Evan's Excellent Adventure" (1993)
 4.11 "Chain of Fools" (1993)
 4.12 "Sleepless in Arkansas" (1993)
 4.14 "The People's Choice" (1994)
 Monty (TV Series) - 2 episodes
 1.3 "The Son Also Rises" (1994)
 1.6 "Baby Talk" (1994)
 Muddling Through (TV Series) - 2 episodes
 1.2 "Let It Be Normal" (1994)
 1.5 "Second Time's the Charm" (1994)
 Good Advice (TV Series) - 2 episodes
 2.3 "Divorce, Egyptian Style" (1994)
 2.12 "Lights, Camera, Friction!" (1994)
 The George Wendt Show (TV Show) - 1 episode
 1.2 "A Need for See" (1995)
 Bringing Up Jack (TV Series) - 1 episode
 Thunder Alley (TV Series) - 21 episodes
 1.2 "The Love Triangle" (1994)
 1.4 "Girls' Night Out" (1994)
 1.5 "Bloodsuckers" (1994)
 1.6 "Happy Endings" (1994)
 2.1 "Never Say Die" (1994)
 2.2 "Speak No Evil" (1994)
 2.3 "Easy Money" (1994)
 2.4 "Get a Job" (1994)
 2.5 "First Date" (1994)
 2.6 "Give 'Em Hell, Bobbi" (1994)
 2.7 "Sex, Lies & Popcorn" (1994)
 2.8 "The Garage Sale" (1994)
 2.9 "Accidentally at First Sight" (1995)
 2.10 "Are We There Yet?" (1995)
 2.12 "The Trouble with Harry" (1995)
 2.13 "Workin' Man's Blues" (1995)
 2.14 "A Little Me Time" (1995)
 2.15 "I Am Spartacus" (1995)
 2.17 "Just a Vacation" (1995)
 2.18 "Buzz Off, Buzzard Boy" (1995)
 2.19 "No Swing Set" (1995)
 Dream On (TV Series) - 1 episodes
 6.1 "Try Not to Remember" (1995)
 Ellen (TV Series) - 25 episodes
 3.1 "Shake, Rattle and Rumble" (1995)
 3.2 "These Successful Friends of Mine" (1995)
 3.3 "The Shower Scene" (1995)
 3.4 "The Bridges of L.A. County" (1995)
 3.5 "Hello, I Must Be Going" (1995)
 3.6 "Trick or Treat - Who Cares?" (1995)
 3.7 "She Ain't Friendly, She's My Mother" (1995)
 3.8 "Salad Days" (1995)
 3.9 "The Movie Show" (1995)
 3.10 "What's Up, Ex-Doc?" (1995)
 3.11 "Ellen's Choice" (1995)
 3.12 "Do You Fear What I Fear?" (1995)
 3.13 "Horschak's Law" (1996)
 3.14 "Morgan, P.I." (1996)
 3.15 "Oh, Sweet Rapture" (1996)
 3.16 "Witness" (1996)
 3.17 "Ellen: With Child" (1996)
 3.18 "Lobster Diary" (1996)
 3.19 "Two Ring Circus" (1996)
 3.20 "A Penney Saved..." (1996)
 3.21 "Too Hip for the Room" (1996)
 3.22 "Two Mammograms and a Wedding" (1996)
 3.23 "Go Girlz" (1996)
 3.24 "When the Vow Breaks: Part 1" (1996)
 3.26 "When the Vow Breaks: Part 2" (1996)
 Life with Roger (TV Series) - 1 episode
 Pearl (TV Series) - 1 episodes
 1.2 "Teacher's Pet" (1996)
 Common Law (TV Series) - 1 episodes
 1.1 "Pilot" (1996)
 Sabrina, the Teenage Witch (TV Series) - 3 episodes
 1.1 "Pilot" (1996)
 1.10 "Sweet & Sour Victory (1996)
 1.17 "First Kiss" (1997)
 Friends (TV Series) - 6 episodes
 1.22 "The One with the Ick Factor" (1995)
 3.12 "The One with All the Jealousy" (1997)
 3.13 "The One Where Monica and Richard Are Just Friends" (1997)
 3.14 "The One with Phoebe's Ex-Partner" (1997)
 3.18 "The One with the Hypnosis Tape" (1997)
 3.24 "The One with the Ultimate Fighting Champion" (1997)
 House Rules (TV Series) - 1 episodes
 1.7 "Who Knew?" (1998)
 The Naked Truth (TV Series) - 14 episodes
 2.8 "The Scoop" (1997)
 2.9 "The Birds" (1997)
 3.1 "Things Change" (1997)
 3.2 "Her Girl Friday" (1997)
 3.3 "Bully for Dave" (1997)
 3.4 "Liesl Weapon" (1997)
 3.5 "Bridesface Revisited" (1997)
 3.7 "Look at Me! Look at Me!" (1997)
 3.12 "Women on the Verge of a Rhytidectomy" (1998)
 3.13 "8 1/2" (1998)
 3.14 "The Neighbor of Bath" (1998)
 3.15 "Day of the Locos" (1998)
 3.17 "Born to Be Wilde" (1998)
 3.16 "Muddy for Nothing" (1998)
 Reunited (TV Series) - 1 episodes
 Brother's Keeper (TV Series) - 1 episode
 1.12 "The Date" (1999)
 Jesse (TV Series) - 8 episodes
 1.2 "Goober Up the Nose" (1998)
 1.3 "Bees Do It, Birds Do It, But Not in a Car" (1998)
 1.4 "Live Nude Girls" (1998)
 1.5 "Boo! He's Back" (1998)
 1.6 "The Methadone Clinic" (1998)
 1.7 "The Kiss" (1998)
 1.8 "The Cheese Ship" (1998)
 1.13 "My Casual Friend's Wedding" (1999)
 Dharma & Greg (TV Series) - 1 episode
 4.7 "Mad Secretaries and Englishmen" (2000)
 Two Guys, a Girl and a Pizza Place (TV Series) - 2 episodes
 4.10 "Rescue Me" (2000)
 4.19 "The Love Boat" (2001)
 The Huntress (TV Series) - 4 episodes
 1.10 "Black Widow" (2001)
 1.15 "Generations" (2001)
 1.19 "Undercover" (2001)
 1.23 "Showdown" (2001)
 Bob Patterson (TV Series) - 1 episodes
 1.5 "Bathroom Bob" (2001)
 8 Simple Rules (TV Series) - 2 episodes
 2.2 "Sex Ed" (2003)
 2.3 "Donny Goes AWOL" (2003)
 I'm with Her (TV Series) - 2 episodes
 1.9 "Meet the Parent" (2003)
 1.10 "The Greatest Christmas Story Ever Told" (2003)
 Baby Bob (TV Series) - 2 episodes
 2.6 "You Don't Know Jack" (2003)
 2.5 "Boys Will Be Girls" (2003)
 Complete Savages (TV Series) - 1 episode
 1.5 "Car Jack" (2004)
 Billy: The Early Years (2008)

Producer
Die Laughing (1980)
Modern Love (1990)
Caligo (2014)
Unwelcome (2014)
Calypso (2014)
Straight Outta Tompkins (2015)

Writer
One on One (1977)
Die Laughing (1980)
Modern Love (1990)
Betrayal of the Dove (1993)

Composer
Walk Proud (1979)
Unwelcome (2014)
Straight Outta Tompkins (2015)

Discography

Singles
"Blue Balloon (The Hourglass Song)" (1973)
"Hey Everybody" (1974)
"A Rock and Roll Song" (1975)
"Adios Yesterday" (1979)
"All I Want Is Love" (1980)

Awards and nominations

References

External links

 
 
 
 
 
 
 

1956 births
20th-century American male actors
21st-century American male actors
American male child actors
American male film actors
American male musical theatre actors
American male soap opera actors
American male video game actors
American male voice actors
American television directors
Film directors from Texas
Indiana University faculty
Jewish American male actors
Jewish singers
Living people
Male actors from Dallas
People with congenital heart defects
Tisch School of the Arts faculty
University of South Carolina faculty
University of Utah faculty